Events from the year 1753 in Denmark.

Incumbents
 Monarch – Frederick V
 Prime minister – Johan Ludvig Holstein-Ledreborg

Events

Undated

Births
 3 August – Adam Levin Søbøtker, estate owner and general war commissioner (died 1823)
 11 October – Frederick, Hereditary Prince of Denmark  (died 1805)

References

 
Years of the 18th century in Denmark
Denmark
Denmark
1750s in Denmark